Carl Gustav Jacob Jacobi (10 December 1804 – 18 February 1851) was a German mathematician who made fundamental contributions to elliptic functions, dynamics, differential equations, determinants, and number theory. His name is occasionally written as Carolus Gustavus Iacobus Iacobi in his Latin books, and his first name is sometimes given as Karl.

Jacobi was the first Jewish mathematician to be appointed professor at a German university.

Biography 
Jacobi was born of Ashkenazi Jewish parentage in Potsdam on 10 December 1804. He was the second of four children of banker Simon Jacobi. His elder brother Moritz von Jacobi would also become known later as an engineer and physicist. He was initially home schooled by his uncle Lehman, who instructed him in the classical languages and elements of mathematics. In 1816, the twelve-year-old Jacobi went to the Potsdam Gymnasium, where students were taught all the standard subjects: classical languages, history, philology, mathematics, sciences, etc. As a result of the good education he had received from his uncle, as well as his own remarkable abilities, after less than half a year Jacobi was moved to the senior year despite his young age. However, as the University would not accept students younger than 16 years old, he had to remain in the senior class until 1821. He used this time to advance his knowledge, showing interest in all subjects, including Latin, Greek, philology, history and mathematics. During this period he also made his first attempts at research, trying to solve the quintic equation by radicals.

In 1821 Jacobi went to study at Berlin University, where he initially divided his attention between his passions for philology and mathematics. In philology he participated in the seminars of Böckh, drawing the professor's attention with his talent. Jacobi did not follow a lot of mathematics classes at the University, as the low level of mathematics at the University of Berlin at the time rendered them too elementary for him. However, he continued with his private study of the more advanced works of Euler, Lagrange and Laplace. By 1823 he understood that he needed to make a decision between his competing interests and chose to devote all his attention to mathematics. In the same year he became qualified to teach secondary school and was offered a position at the Joachimsthal Gymnasium in Berlin. Jacobi decided instead to continue to work towards a University position. In 1825 he obtained the degree of Doctor of Philosophy with a dissertation on the partial fraction decomposition of rational fractions defended before a commission led by Enno Dirksen. He followed immediately with his Habilitation and at the same time converted to Christianity. Now qualifying for teaching University classes, the 21-year-old Jacobi lectured in 1825/26 on the theory of curves and surfaces at the University of Berlin.

In 1827 Jacobi became a professor and in 1829, a tenured professor of mathematics at Königsberg University, and held the chair until 1842.
He suffered a breakdown from overwork in 1843. He then visited Italy for a few months to regain his health. On his return he moved to Berlin, where he lived as a royal pensioner until his death. During the Revolution of 1848 Jacobi was politically involved and unsuccessfully presented his parliamentary candidature on behalf of a Liberal club. This led, after the suppression of the revolution, to his royal grant being cut off – but his fame and reputation were such that it was soon resumed. In 1836, he had been elected a foreign member of the Royal Swedish Academy of Sciences.

Jacobi died in 1851 from a smallpox infection.  His grave is preserved at a cemetery in the Kreuzberg section of Berlin, the Friedhof I der Dreifaltigkeits-Kirchengemeinde (61 Baruther Street). His grave is close to that of Johann Encke, the astronomer. The crater Jacobi on the Moon is named after him.

Scientific contributions 
One of Jacobi's greatest accomplishments was his theory of elliptic functions and their relation to the elliptic theta function.  This was developed in his great treatise Fundamenta nova theoriae functionum ellipticarum (1829), and in later papers in Crelle's Journal. Theta functions are of great importance in mathematical physics because of their role in the inverse problem for periodic and quasi-periodic flows.  The equations of motion are integrable in terms of Jacobi's elliptic functions in the well-known cases of the pendulum,  the Euler top,  the symmetric Lagrange top in a gravitational field and the Kepler problem (planetary motion in a central gravitational field).

He also made fundamental contributions in the study of differential equations and to classical mechanics, notably the Hamilton–Jacobi theory.

It was in algebraic development that Jacobi's particular power mainly lay, and he made important contributions of this kind in many areas of mathematics, as shown by his long list of papers in Crelle's Journal and elsewhere from 1826 onwards.  He is said to have told his students that when looking for a research topic, one should  'Invert, always invert' ('man muss immer umkehren'), reflecting his belief that inverting known results can open up new fields for research, for example inverting elliptical integrals and focusing on the nature of elliptic and theta functions.

In his 1835 paper, Jacobi proved the following basic result classifying periodic (including elliptic) functions:
If a univariate single-valued function is multiply periodic, then such a function cannot have more than two periods, and the ratio of the periods cannot be a real number. 
He discovered many of the fundamental properties of theta functions, including the functional equation and the Jacobi triple product formula, as well as many other results on q-series and hypergeometric series.

The solution of the Jacobi inversion problem for the hyperelliptic Abel map by Weierstrass in 1854 required the introduction of the hyperelliptic theta function and later the general Riemann theta function for algebraic curves of arbitrary genus. The complex torus associated to a genus  algebraic curve, obtained by quotienting  by the lattice of periods is referred to as the Jacobian variety. This method of inversion, and its subsequent extension by Weierstrass and Riemann to arbitrary algebraic curves, may be seen as a higher genus generalization of the relation between elliptic integrals and the Jacobi or Weierstrass elliptic functions.

Jacobi was the first to apply elliptic functions to number theory, for example proving Fermat's two-square theorem and Lagrange's four-square theorem, and similar results for 6 and 8 squares.
His other work in number theory continued the work of C. F. Gauss:  new proofs of quadratic reciprocity and introduction of the Jacobi symbol; contributions to higher reciprocity laws, investigations of continued fractions, and the invention of Jacobi sums.

He was also one of the early founders of the theory of determinants. In particular, he invented the Jacobian determinant formed from the n2 partial derivatives of n given functions of n independent variables, which plays an important part in changes of variables in multiple integrals, and in many analytical investigations. In 1841 he reintroduced the partial derivative ∂ notation of Legendre, which was to become standard.

He was one of the first to introduce and study the symmetric polynomials that are now known as Schur polynomials, giving the so-called bialternant formula for these, which is a special case of the Weyl character formula, and deriving the Jacobi–Trudi identities. He also discovered the Desnanot–Jacobi formula for determinants, which underlie the Plucker relations for Grassmannians.

Students of vector fields, Lie theory, Hamiltonian mechanics and operator algebras often encounter the Jacobi identity, the analog of associativity for the Lie bracket operation.

Planetary theory and other particular dynamical problems likewise occupied his attention from time to time. While contributing to celestial mechanics,  he introduced the Jacobi integral (1836) for a sidereal coordinate system. His theory of the last multiplier is treated in Vorlesungen über Dynamik, edited by Alfred Clebsch (1866).

He left many manuscripts, portions of which have been published at intervals in Crelle's Journal. His other works include Commentatio de transformatione integralis duplicis indefiniti in formam simpliciorem (1832), Canon arithmeticus (1839), and Opuscula mathematica (1846–1857). His Gesammelte Werke (1881–1891) were published by the Berlin Academy.

Publications

See also 
 Augustin-Louis Cauchy
 Friedrich Wilhelm August Argelander
 Friedrich Wilhelm Bessel
 Jacobi logarithm
 Johann Friedrich Herbart
 Last geometric statement of Jacobi
 List of things named after Carl Gustav Jacob Jacobi

References

Citations

Sources

External links 

 Jacobi's Vorlesungen über Dynamik
 
 
 
 
 Carl Gustav Jacob Jacobi - Œuvres complètes Gallica-Math

1804 births
1851 deaths
19th-century German mathematicians
Corresponding members of the Saint Petersburg Academy of Sciences
Deaths from smallpox
Differential geometers
Foreign Members of the Royal Society
19th-century German Jews
Honorary members of the Saint Petersburg Academy of Sciences
Humboldt University of Berlin alumni
Members of the Prussian Academy of Sciences
Members of the Royal Swedish Academy of Sciences
Number theorists
People from Potsdam
People from the Margraviate of Brandenburg
People of the Revolutions of 1848
Recipients of the Pour le Mérite (civil class)
Academic staff of the University of Königsberg